Robert Frederick "Bob" Way (1872 – 30 June 1947) was a New Zealand politician and trade unionist. He was an organiser and candidate for the Socialist Party, Social Democratic Party then the Labour Party standing many time for office himself.

Biography

Early life
Way was born in 1872 in Australia. He spent his early years working as a journalist and studied at the University of Queensland without graduating before moving to New Zealand in 1900. Once in New Zealand he likewise worked as a journalist and became involved in the local labour movement. He was a regular contributor to the Maoriland Worker, New Zealand's leading labour journal of the time.

Prior to World War I he was highly active in the Auckland trade unions and was involved in the Waihi miners' strike. Way was secretary of the Auckland Waterside Workers' Union and president of the Auckland Coopers' and Curriers' Unions.

Political career
Way stood for election to the New Zealand House of Representatives five times. He also unsuccessfully stood for the Auckland City Council in 1905, 1907, 1919 and 1921.

Death
Way died in 1947.

Notes

References

1872 births
1947 deaths
Australian emigrants to New Zealand
New Zealand trade unionists
New Zealand journalists
New Zealand Labour Party politicians
Social Democratic Party (New Zealand) politicians
New Zealand Socialist Party politicians
Unsuccessful candidates in the 1905 New Zealand general election
Unsuccessful candidates in the 1908 New Zealand general election
Unsuccessful candidates in the 1919 New Zealand general election
Unsuccessful candidates in the 1922 New Zealand general election
Unsuccessful candidates in the 1925 New Zealand general election